Nickolas Ralpheal Neal (born November 17, 1988) is an American professional basketball player who last played for Vojvodina of the Basketball League of Serbia. He played college basketball at Purdue North Central from 2010 to 2012.

College career
In his junior season (2011), he was a second team All-Conference selection with 16.5 points per game.

In 2016, Neal was inducted in to the Purdue North Central Hall of Fame.

Professional career
He started his professional career with BK Team Vieste (Serie C Silver) in Italy. By first four years in Italy he never averaged lower than 24.4 points per game. On November 2, 2018, he has signed with BC Cactus Tbilisi of the Georgian Superliga. During 2018-19 season he averaged 16.1 points, 3.8 rebounds and 4.4 assists per game.

Neal joined the Croatian league's KK Alkar on August 21, 2019. He scored 18.4 points per game, 5.5 assists, 3.8 rebounds and 2.1 steals in 20 games.

On May 29, 2020, he signed with HydroTruck Radom of the Polish Basketball League. He averaged 14.9 points, 4.7 assists and 1.6 steals per game. On September 29, 2020 he was named MVP of the fifth round Polish Basketball League.

On November 18, 2020, he has signed with Legia Warszawa of the Polish Basketball League. Neal averaged 8.9 points, 3.1 assists, and 2.0 rebounds per game. On October 10, 2021, he signed with Vojvodina of the Basketball League of Serbia.

References

External links
Eurobasket.com Profile
Espn.com Profile

1988 births
Living people
American expatriate basketball people in Poland
American expatriate basketball people in Croatia
American expatriate basketball people in Georgia (country)
American expatriate basketball people in Italy
American expatriate basketball people in Serbia
American men's basketball players
Basketball League of Serbia players
Basketball players from Florida
KK Vojvodina players
Rosa Radom players
Legia Warsaw (basketball) players
Point guards
KK Alkar players